Vincent Lafko (7 June 1945 in Hranovnica – 15 December 2012 in Prešov) is a Czechoslovak/Slovak handball player who competed in the 1972 Summer Olympics.

He was part of the Czechoslovak team which won the silver medal at the Munich Games. He played five matches including the final and scored three goals.

References

External links
 profile

1945 births
2012 deaths
Czechoslovak male handball players
Slovak male handball players
Olympic handball players of Czechoslovakia
Handball players at the 1972 Summer Olympics
Olympic silver medalists for Czechoslovakia
Olympic medalists in handball
Medalists at the 1972 Summer Olympics
People from Poprad District
Sportspeople from the Prešov Region